Emmanuel Lecomte (born 16 August 1995) is a Belgian basketball player for Hapoel Eilat of the Israeli Basketball Premier League. He played college basketball for the Baylor Bears and Miami Hurricanes and for the Belgian national team.

Career

College
He played two years at Miami, before transferring to Baylor. He scored 7.7 points and dished out 2.3 assists per game while shooting 42.5 percent from the field as a sophomore. However, he saw his minutes fall playing alongside Ángel Rodríguez. 

As a senior at Baylor, Lecomte averaged 16.2 points per game and was named to the Second-team All-Big 12.

Professional
He went undrafted in the 2018 NBA draft but signed with the Dallas Mavericks in the NBA Summer League.

He joined the Agua Caliente Clippers of the NBA G League for the 2018–19 season after being selected 20th overall in the G League draft.

On 28 March 2019 he signed with Liga ACB team UCAM Murcia.  Lecomte joined Gran Canaria in February 2020, averaging 5.4 points and 1.0 assist per game. On October 13, he signed with Fraport Skyliners of the Basketball Bundesliga.

On January 27, 2021, he signed with Élan Béarnais of the French LNB Pro A. On March 2, 2021, he signed with BC Prienai of the Lithuanian Basketball League. Lecomte averaged 14.9 points, 5.1 assists and 2.1 rebounds per game. On September 16, he signed with BC Jonava.

On November 12, 2022, he signed with Hapoel Eilat of the Israeli Basketball Premier League.

On February 6, 2023, he signed with Budućnost VOLI of the ABA League and EuroCup.

For Belgium

College statistics

References

External links
Baylor Bears bio

1995 births
Living people
Agua Caliente Clippers players
Baylor Bears men's basketball players
Belgian expatriate basketball people in Spain
Belgian expatriate basketball people in the United States
Belgian men's basketball players
Belgium national basketball players
CB Murcia players
Miami Hurricanes men's basketball players
People from Ixelles
Point guards
Shooting guards
Skyliners Frankfurt players
Sportspeople from Brussels